The al-Beida Mosque (Berber: ⵎⴻⵣⴳⵉⴷⴰ ⴰⵛⵎⵔⴰⵔ) is a mosque in Fes el-Jdid in the historic old city of Fez, Morocco.

History 
The construction or foundation of the mosque dates from after that of the nearby al-Hamra Mosque and is thus likely from after the Marinid period. Boris Maslow (20th-century author who documented many of Fez's mosques) believed that the building's layout showed indications that it started out as a small interior space (near the mihrab today) and that it was subsequently expanded to the larger complex seen today. The expansion probably consisted of the courtyard (sahn) and its surrounding gallery, which, unusually, are wider than the main prayer hall itself and thus appear to have been added afterwards. The minaret of the mosque would also date from this expansion.

The mosque's name, jama' beida or jama' al-beida, means either "White Mosque" or "Mosque of the White One". Since the form of the word beida (or bayda) is grammatically feminine, Roger Le Tourneau suggested that it refers to either a white minaret or a “white lady” (both plausible and grammatically feminine words).

Architecture and layout

Exterior 
The entrance of the mosque is located on the Grande Rue (main road) of Fes el-Jdid, projecting from the main building on its western side but now flanked by shops or other structures. The gateway consists of a horseshoe arch surrounded by carved stucco decoration and sheltered by a small overhanging canopy of carved wood topped by green roof tiles. Next to the entrance is a historic public fountain set into the exterior wall of the mosque and decorated with zellij mosaic tilework. The minaret of the mosque stands behind and slightly to the right (or south) of the entrance and the fountain.

Interior 
The entrance leads to a nearly square courtyard (sahn) measuring 8.17 by 8.47 metres and surrounded by an arched gallery. The floor of the courtyard is covered in zellij tilework and at its middle is a fountain with a marble basin. On the courtyard's south side, the gallery gives access to the main prayer hall, which is less wide than the courtyard's gallery (probably because it is older than the rest of the building and the courtyard was added to expand it). This prayer space which is further divided by a row of slightly unequal arches. The mihrab (niche symbolizing the direction of prayer) has the same form as most traditional Moroccan mihrabs but is relatively simple and undecorated.

In the corner between the prayer hall, the courtyard, and the minaret is an ablutions room which can be entered directly from the street but which was also once accessible by a passage from the main courtyard as well. The room is centered around a rectangular water basin and is flanked by seven smaller rooms which served as latrines.

Minaret 
The minaret has a square shaft and an overall form typical of Moroccan minarets. Its main shaft is 12.6 metres tall and each of its sides is 2.82 metres wide. The small secondary shaft above this is 3.25 metres tall, and topped by a cupola. The surface of the minaret is covered in whitewash and is decorated relatively simply with carved reliefs of geometric patterns and outlines around the narrow windows.

See also
  Lists of mosques 
  List of mosques in Africa
  List of mosques in Morocco

References

Mosques in Fez, Morocco